Vincetoxicum hirundinaria, commonly named white swallow-wort, is a long-lived herbaceous perennial of the genus Vincetoxicum in the family Apocynaceae.

Etymology
The generic name Vincetoxicum, in Latin meaning ‘conqueror of poison’, derives from the traditional use of this plant as an antidote to poisons. The Latin species name hirundinaria (from hirundo, meaning swallow) and the common name white swallow-wort refer to its seedpods, that  are reminiscent of a swallow's wing, or tail.

Description
Stem is erect, stout and glabrous. Flowers in whorls form a raceme. Corolla has five white petals. Calyx is composed by five fused, sharp-pointed sepals. Leaves are opposite, ovate to lanceolate and short-stalked. Fruits reach a length of about 5 cm and contain many seeds showing a tuft of white hairs. Flowering time lasts from June to the end of July.

Distribution and habitat
This species is native to cliffs and slopes, especially in calcareous soils, of continental Eurasia (including some Baltic islands).  There are introduced populations in North America (Ontario, Michigan, and New York). It is not present in Great Britain and Ireland.

Human culture
Vincetoxicum hirundinaria is a poisonous plant traditionally used in treating diseases and in magic. The plant was mentioned by Pedanius Dioscorides as a traditional plant used by Dacians and known as the "herb of animals", believed to open any locked door.

Gallery

References

External links

hirundinaria
Flora of Asia
Flora of Europe